Patrik Dag Erickson  (born March 13, 1969) is a Swedish former ice hockey player. He was selected by the Winnipeg Jets in the 2nd round (37th overall) of the 1987 NHL Entry Draft.

Erickson played with Team Sweden at the 1992 Winter Olympics.

Career statistics

Regular season and playoffs

International

References

External links

1969 births
Living people
Brynäs IF players
Djurgårdens IF Hockey players
Ice hockey players at the 1992 Winter Olympics
Olympic ice hockey players of Sweden
Skellefteå AIK players
Swedish ice hockey centres
Winnipeg Jets (1979–1996) draft picks